Eric William Blake Cross (January 27, 1904 – February 25, 1965) was an Ontario judge and political figure. He represented Haldimand—Norfolk in the Legislative Assembly of Ontario from 1937 to 1943 as a Liberal member.

Background
Cross was born in 1904 in Madoc, Ontario. His parents were William Cross and Mary Judith Falls. He also became Chairman of the Ontario Municipal Board. Cross served as a Provincial Magistrate and County Court judge. He died in Woodstock, Ontario at the age of 61, while trying to walk from his stranded car to his home during "the worst snowstorm in 21 years".

Politics
Cross served as Minister of Municipal Affairs and Public Welfare from 1937 to 1940; he was Attorney General and Minister of Municipal Affairs in 1943.

Cabinet posts

References

External links 

Biography, Eric William Blake Cross fonds, Archives of Ontario

1904 births
1965 deaths
Attorneys General of Ontario
Judges in Ontario
Ontario Liberal Party MPPs
20th-century Canadian lawyers